Ron Steele is an American local news anchor at KWWL in Waterloo, Iowa. Since 1974, he has been at KWWL, where he started as the sports director, and is Iowa's longest sitting anchor. KWWL-TV is the NBC affiliate for the Cedar Rapids–Waterloo–Iowa City–Dubuque television market.

While he was still KWWL's sports director, he did play-by-play for NBC Sports and ESPN. He was the original play-by-play voice of the Iowa Television Network, which broadcast University of Iowa basketball games over a statewide network. He also was in Saudi Arabia during the Persian Gulf War, and at the White House when the hostages came home from Iran and he interviewed President George W. Bush on Air Force One.

References

External links
KWWL.com

Living people
American television news anchors
Year of birth missing (living people)